Duty-free permit (or Duty-free vehicle permit or Motor Vehicle Permit on Concessionary Terms) is a permit issued by the Treasury of the Government of Sri Lanka that allows its holder to import a vehicle into Sri Lanka on duties concessions or exempt from certain taxes.

Currently entitled
Following category of individuals are entitled to duty-free permits;
Legislators
Members of Parliament
Provincial councilors 
Public officers (who have served a minimum term defined)
 Senior grade officers of the public service, parliament or appointed by cabinet minister.
 Officers of holding the posts of medical officer, engineer, accountant, architect and lawyer.  
 Senior executives of state corporations or statutory institutions.
 Senior academics and executives of state universities.
 Executive grade officers in the Central Bank of Sri Lanka.
 Executive grade officers defined by the Department of Management Services;
 Senior executives
 Charted Engineers, Charted Accountants and Charted Architects
 Chancellors of the Universities
 Registered Medical Officers
 Project Directors, Charted Engineers, Charted Accountants, Charted Architects and lawyers of a development project
 Chairmen and members of a commission established as per the provisions of the constitution
Military officers
Officers of the ranks and above lieutenant colonel, wing commander and commander.

References

Government of Sri Lanka
Customs duties
Tax avoidance
Taxation in Sri Lanka